Barry Cheesman (born August 29, 1959) is an American professional golfer who played on the Nationwide Tour and the PGA Tour, before getting into golf he was a minor league baseball player.

Cheesman was drafted by the St. Louis Cardinals in the 1977 Major League Baseball Draft with the 613th pick in the 25th round but never made it to the majors, spending four years in the minors. He was a catcher and a pitcher. He played for the Johnson City Cardinals of the Appalachian League and the Calgary Cardinals of the Pioneer Baseball League. He was traded to the California Angels organization in 1979 and played for the Salinas Angels of the California League. He was traded again to the New York Yankees organization in 1980 and played for the GCL Yankees of the Gulf Coast League. Cheesman called it quits after that season and became a golf professional in 1986.

Cheesman earned his PGA Tour card for 1988 through qualifying school. In his rookie year on Tour he only made 6 of 30 cuts and failed to retain his Tour card. He joined the Nationwide Tour in 1990 and won the Ben Hogan Quail Hollow Open en route to a 13th-place finish on the money list which earned him his PGA Tour card for 1991. He struggled on Tour again, and had to return to qualifying school in 1992 where he earned his Tour card for 1993. After another poor season on the PGA Tour he took a hiatus from the PGA and Nationwide Tour and returned in 1997. He won the Nike Hershey Open en route to a 6th-place finish on the money list, earning him his PGA Tour card for 1998. He had his best year on Tour, finishing 100th on the money list. He had an even better year in 1999, finishing 95th on the money list while recording three top-10 finishes. He didn't fare as well in 2000 and finished 141st on the money list to earn partial status on Tour in 2001. He returned to the Nationwide Tour in 2002 and played on it until 2006 until retiring.

Cheesman was a scout for the Houston Astros in 2007. He is currently working as a golf professional in Florida.

Professional wins (2)

Nike Tour wins (2)

Results in major championships

Note: The U.S. Open was the only major Cheesman played.

CUT = missed the half-way cut

See also
1987 PGA Tour Qualifying School graduates
1990 PGA Tour Qualifying School graduates
1992 PGA Tour Qualifying School graduates
1997 Nike Tour graduates

External links

American male golfers
PGA Tour golfers
Korn Ferry Tour graduates
Golfers from Illinois
Baseball players from Illinois
Minor league baseball players
Calgary Cardinals players
Johnson City Cardinals players
Salinas Angels players
People from Galesburg, Illinois
1959 births
Living people